Melzerella lutzi is a species of beetle in the family Cerambycidae. It was described by Costa Lima in 1931.

References

Aerenicini
Beetles described in 1931